Temperate broadleaf and mixed forest is a temperate climate terrestrial habitat type defined by the World Wide Fund for Nature, with broadleaf tree ecoregions, and with conifer and broadleaf tree mixed coniferous forest ecoregions. 

These forests are richest and most distinctive in central China and eastern North America, with some other globally distinctive ecoregions in the Caucasus, the Himalayas, Southern Europe, Australasia, Southwestern South America and the Russian Far East.

Ecology
The typical structure of these forests includes four layers. 
Below the canopy is the three-layered, shade-tolerant understory that is roughly  shorter than the canopy. 
 The top layer of the understory is the sub-canopy composed of smaller mature trees, saplings, and suppressed juvenile canopy layer trees awaiting an opening in the canopy. 
 Below the sub-canopy is the shrub layer, composed of low growing woody plants. 
 Typically the lowest growing (and most diverse) layer is the ground cover or herbaceous layer.

Trees
In the Northern hemisphere, characteristic dominant broadleaf trees in this biome include oaks (Quercus spp.), beeches (Fagus spp.), maples (Acer spp.), or birches (Betula spp.). The term "mixed forest" comes from the inclusion of coniferous trees as a canopy component of some of these forests. Typical coniferous trees include pines (Pinus spp.), firs (Abies spp.), and spruces (Picea spp.). In some areas of this biome, the conifers may be a more important canopy species than the broadleaf species. In the Southern Hemisphere, endemic genera such as Nothofagus and Eucalyptus occupy this biome, and most coniferous trees (members of the Araucariaceae and Podocarpaceae) occur in mixtures with broadleaf species, and are classed as broadleaf and mixed forests.

Climate
Temperate broadleaf and mixed forests occur in areas with distinct warm and cool seasons that give them moderate annual average temperatures: . These forests occur in relatively warm and rainy climates, sometimes also with a distinct dry season. A dry season occurs in the winter in East Asia and in summer on the wet fringe of the Mediterranean climate zones. Temperatures are typically moderate except in parts of Asia such as Ussuriland, where temperate forests can occur despite very harsh conditions with very cold winters.

The climates are typically humid for much of the year, usually appearing in the humid subtropical climate without summer being extremely hot and winter very mild, and in the humid continental climate zones to the south of tundra and the generally subarctic taiga. In the Köppen climate classification they are represented respectively by Cfa, Dfa/Dfb southern range and Cfb, and more rarely, Csb, BSk and Csa.

Ecoregions

Australasia

Eurasia

Americas

See also
 Mixed coniferous forest
 Kuchler plant association system
 Mediterranean forests, woodlands, and scrub
 Temperate deciduous forest
 Trees of the world

References

External links

World Wildlife Fund−WWF Biomes: Temperate broadleaf and mixed forests biome 
Temperate forest
Bioimages.vanderbilt.edu: Index of North American Temperate Broadleaf & Mixed Forests ecoregions 
Terraformers Canadian Forest Conservation Foundation

 
Forests
Terrestrial biomes